Series 14 of Top Gear, a British motoring magazine and factual television programme, was broadcast in the United Kingdom on BBC Two, consisting of seven episodes that were aired between 15 November 2009 to 3 January 2010. It is the first series that was also aired in high-definition. This series' highlights included the presenters making their own electric car, hosting a car-themed art exhibition, and a tribute to the car manufacturer Lancia. The sixth episode of the series was dedicated to a feature-length special, titled Top Gear: Bolivia Special, focused on a road trip with off-road vehicles.

A series of compilation episodes featuring the best moments of the thirteenth and fourteenth series, titled "Best of Top Gear", was aired during 2010 between 10 January to 7 February. The fourteenth series faced criticism for its feature film in the first episode, regarding comments considered unacceptable to Romanians.

Episodes

Best-of episodes

Criticism
Several Romanian newspapers criticised the comments made by Jeremy Clarkson in the fourteenth series' first episode, designed as a reference to the 2006 mockumentary that starred Sacha Baron Cohen as his fictional journalist character from Kazakhstan, with comments that Romania was "Borat country, with gypsies and Russian playboys". Because the film had already stirred controversy in the country, with a number of local Roma who had been involved in the film attempting to sue 20th Century Fox and Cohen, it was claimed that the comments had been "offensive" and had produced "bad publicity for their country", with the Romanian Times also reporting that Clarkson had called Romania a "gypsy land".

Further complaints were also made in regards to a scene in which Clarkson donned a pork pie hat and called it a "gypsy" hat, while commenting: "I'm wearing this hat so the gypsies think I am [another gypsy]." Following the episode, the Romanian ambassador sent a letter to the producers of Top Gear, in which he showed his appreciation for the show, highlighted the press's freedom of expression, the non-discriminatory spirit, and the fact that 89.5% of the country's population is Romanian, 6.5% is ethnic Hungarians, 2.5% are ethnic Roma and 1.5% are other ethnic groups, but asked that the episode be re-edited to exclude the offensive material in future showings. In another response to the episode after its broadcast, a group of Romanians hacked over two pages of the Daily Telegraph website, covering them in Romanian flags and playing Gheorghe Zamfir - Lonely Shepherd (featured on the soundtrack to the film Kill Bill) while stating:

"We are sick of being mis-represented as Gypsies, and thanks to Top Gear, have been publicly insulted."

Notes
The viewing figures shown in the Episode Table above, are a combination of the figures from the BBC Two broadcast and the BBC HD broadcast.

References 

2009 British television seasons
2010 British television seasons
Top Gear seasons